Children's Notebook (Op. 69) is a set of seven solo pieces for piano composed by Dmitri Shostakovich in 1944–1945. The selections were chosen from pieces written by the composer to his daughter, Galina Dmitrievna Shostakovich, for her piano studies. Only six of them were originally published under this title in 1945 ; the seventh piece ("Birthday", written for his daughter's ninth birthday in 1945) was appended in 1983 to the collection.

The sixth piece in the set ("Clockwork Doll") echoes the motif used in Shostakovich's first composition, his Scherzo for Orchestra in F minor (Op. 1). "Birthday" (the seventh piece) begins with a motif which foreshadows the fanfare motif at the beginning of Shostakovich's Festive Overture (Op. 96).

The Children’s Notebook was composed by Shostakovich for his daughter Galina, who was then a child and starting to learn piano lessons. The composer promised her that as soon she mastered one piece he would compose another. Shostakovich recorded all of them during the 1947 Prague Spring Festival.

Pieces
March
Valse
The Bear
Merry Tale
Sad Tale
The Clockwork Doll
Birthday (published in 1983)

References

Compositions by Dmitri Shostakovich
Compositions for solo piano
1945 compositions